Methiolopsis is a genus of grasshoppers in the family Acrididae. The sole species of the genus is Methiolopsis geniculata, sometimes called "little black knees", found in eastern Australia.

References

External links

 

Acrididae